Magda Oranich i Solagran (born 11 December 1945) is a Spanish lawyer, journalist and politician from Catalonia. She was a member of the  Parliament of Catalonia in its 4th session, and stood for election again, unsuccessfully, in 2017. Her legal speciality is in family law.

Oranich graduated in law from the University of Barcelona in 1968. She defended several political prisoners under the Franco regime, including Salvador Puig Antich. She has worked on issues of women's rights and human rights, representing many victims of rape and assault, and also the victims of the Francoist orphanages. She has been active in the field of animal rights, in particular in the campaign which led to the abolition of bullfighting in Catalonia in 2010. She has served FC Barcelona in several roles and was appointed to its board in 2009.

References

1945 births
Living people
Women members of the Parliament of Catalonia
Members of the 4th Parliament of Catalonia
21st-century Spanish lawyers
Women lawyers from Catalonia
University of Barcelona alumni